Jori may refer to:
Jori, old noble family of Zurich
Jori, percussion instrument from Punjab